The  narrow gauge Portstewart Tramway operated tramway services between Portstewart and Portstewart railway station at Cromore from 1882 to 1926.

History

The Portstewart Tramway Company, formed by a group of local businessmen, built the Portstewart Tramway in 1882 to link Portstewart to Portstewart railway station on the Belfast and Northern Counties Railway Coleraine–Portrush railway line.

Services started around 21 June 1882, a few days in advance of the arrival of the formal permission from the Board of Trade on 28 June 1882. Two tram engines were obtained from Kitson and Company.

The tramway went into liquidation in 1897 and was purchased for £2,100 by the Belfast and Northern Counties Railway. They invested in the tramway providing some additional passenger vehicles and a new steam tramway engine. A new depot was constructed in Portstewart by the railway engineer Berkeley Deane Wise in 1899, at the southern end of the promenade, opposite the Town Hall.

It became part of the Midland Railway in 1903, and the London, Midland and Scottish Railway in 1923.

Closure
The service ceased on 30 January 1926. A replacement bus service was provided by the London, Midland and Scottish Railway

Tram engine 1 is preserved at the Streetlife Museum of Transport Hull
Tram engine 2 is in the Ulster Folk and Transport Museum

References

Tram transport in Northern Ireland
Midland Railway
London, Midland and Scottish Railway constituents
3 ft gauge railways in Northern Ireland